Wake Up India is a 2013 Indian Hindi-language political drama film written & directed by Babloo Seshadri. It is produced by Shree Balajee Entertainment in association with Kanishka Films. Starring Sai Tamhankar, Manoj Joshi, Mukesh Tiwari, Mohan Joshi, Asrani, Elisha Kriis. The film  released on 25 October 2013. The Times of India stated that "the issues raised here are valid but the execution is immature". The film raised valid questions towards the growth and development of the nation and the hostile behavior of the political parties involved.

Cast
 Sai Tamhankar
 Manoj Joshi
 Aanjjan Srivastav
 Elisha Kriis as Supriya 
 Mukesh Tiwari
 Mohan Joshi 
 Milind Gunaji
 Anant Jog
 Adi Irani
 Mushtaq Khan
 Atul Parchure
 Asrani
 Anjula Singh Mahor

References

External links

2010s Hindi-language films
2013 films
Indian political drama films
2013 drama films
Hindi-language drama films
2010s political drama films